RBC Rock the Park, formerly known as Start.ca Rocks the Park and Hawk Rocks the Park, is an annual music concert held at Harris Park in London, Ontario, Canada. From 2004 to 2008, it was primarily a classic rock concert sponsored by radio station 103.9 The Hawk. In 2010, the three-day concert was sponsored by three radio stations: 98.1 Free FM,  FM96, and country music station BX93.

For the first 12 years, the purpose of the event was to raise money for Bethany's Hope Foundation for MLD Research, which raised over $2.2 million.

Since 2016, Rock the Park has teamed up with the following charities: Big Brothers Big Sisters of London and Area, Make-A-Wish Southwestern Ontario and Children's Health Foundation, while also supporting Western Mustangs Football. In 2019, they rebranded the name to Start.ca Rocks the Park with their partnership with Start.ca. In 2023, they again rebranded to RBC Rock the Park to reflect their partnership with Royal Bank of Canada.

Rock the Park I 
The first Rock the Park was held July 22–24 in 2004. Its main function was to raise money for Bethany's Hope Foundation and it raised more than $110,000. It featured several musical groups:

Thursday, July 22
 Blood, Sweat & Tears
 Randy Bachman
 Lighthouse
 Voodoo Lounge

Friday, July 23
 Alice Cooper
 Foghat
 Edgar Winter
 Helix

Saturday, July 24
 Steppenwolf
 April Wine
 Honeymoon Suite
 Goddo

Hawk Rocks the Park... Again 

The second edition of Rock the Park was held over four days during July 21–24, 2005. Due to the success of the first concert, this second one was expanded to four days, during which over 40,000 Rock fans attended. It featured:

Thursday, July 21
 ZZ Top
 Randy Bachman
 Brian Howe
 Trooper
 Jimmy Bowskillz Band

Friday, July 22
 Lou Gramm (Former singer of Foreigner)
 April Wine
 Sass Jordan
 Chilliwack

Saturday, July 23
 REO Speedwagon
 Glass Tiger
 The Box
 Superfreak

Sunday, July 24
 George Thorogood & The Destroyers
 David Wilcox
 Thundermug (Playing in their last concert for a long time)

Rock the Park III 
Held July 20–22, 2006, the groups that took part were:

Thursday, July 20
 Peter Frampton
 Eddie Money
 Loverboy
 Ray Lyell & The Storm

Friday, July 21
 Styx
 Kim Mitchell
 April Wine
 Saga

Saturday, July 22
 Alice Cooper
 Vince Neil (of Mötley Crüe)
 Quiet Riot
 Helix

Rock the Park III managed to raise $180,021 for the Bethany's Hope Foundation.

Hawk Rocks the Park: Back 4 More 
Rock the Park IV was run July 26–28, 2007.

Thursday, July 26
 Deep Purple
 Ted Nugent
 Nazareth
 Honeymoon Suite

Friday, July 27
 Pat Benatar & Neil Giraldo
 Cheap Trick
 Rik Emmett (of Triumph)
 Trooper

Saturday, July 28
 George Thorogood & The Destroyers
 Creedence Clearwater Revisited
 David Wilcox
 Rick Derringer

One of the announced bands was supposed to be Boston. The announcement was postponed after the death of Brad Delp. Subsequently, all of Boston's plans for touring, including Hawk Rocks the Park, were cancelled.

Hawk Rocks the Park 5 
Rock the Park 5 ran from July 23 to July 26, 2008.

Wednesday, July 23
Ted Nugent
Great White
Diamond Dust (Winner of Rockstar Fantasy)

Thursday, July 24
 Sammy Hagar
 Joan Jett & The Blackhearts
 Skid Row
 Lee Aaron

Friday July 25
 Steve Winwood
 Tom Cochrane
 Sweet
 Pat Travers

Saturday July 26
 Randy Bachman and Burton Cummings
 Mark Farner (of Grand Funk Railroad)
 April Wine
 Streetheart

Rock the Park 2009 
Rock the Park 2009 was held July 23–25, 2009. This marked the first time Rock the Park was not fully put on by The Hawk. Instead it was put on by two other major London radio stations as well. July 23 was presented by FM96, July 24 by BX93, and July 25 by The Hawk.

Thursday, July 23
 The Tragically Hip
 Kathleen Edwards
 Arkells
 The Spades

Friday, July 24
Big & Rich
Cowboy Troy
Aaron Pritchett
Shane Yellowbird

Saturday, July 25
The Doobie Brothers
Creedence Clearwater Revisited
Dennis DeYoung (Former singer of Styx)
Lighthouse

Rock the Park 2010 
Rock the Park 2010 was held from July 22–24, 2010. It was presented by Bob FM. Approximately $1 million was raised for the Bethany's Hope Foundation.

Thursday, July 22
3 Doors Down
Collective Soul
Thornley
Crash Karma

Friday, July 23
Alice Cooper
Peter Frampton
Night Ranger
Alannah Myles

Saturday, July 24
Lynyrd Skynyrd
Heart
April Wine
Mitch Ryder & The Detroit Wheels

Rock the Park 2011 
The 2011 edition of Rock the Park took place over three days in July 2011.  That year's sponsors included FM 96, 103.1 Fresh FM, 103.9 Greatest Hits FM and AM980, among others.

Thursday, July 21
 Poison
 John Kay & Steppenwolf
 Trooper
 Loverboy

Friday, July 22
Meat Loaf
Cheap Trick
Blue Öyster Cult
Brian Howe (Singer of Bad Company)

Saturday, July 23
Stone Temple Pilots
Our Lady Peace
Sloan
Bleeker Ridge

Rock the Park 2012 
Thursday July 26, 2012 (Modern Rock Night)
Slash w/ Myles Kennedy
Bush
I Mother Earth
Monster Truck

Friday July 27, 2012 (Classic Rock Night 1)
The Steve Miller Band
George Thorogood
David Wilcox
The Romantics

Saturday July 28, 2012 (Classic Rock Night 2)
Boston
REO Speedwagon
54-40
Prism

Rock the Park 2013, 10th Anniversary 
Thursday July 25, 2013 (Modern Rock Night)
The Tragically Hip
The Trews
The Rural Alberta Advantage
Greg Ball and The Dry County Rebels

Friday July 26, 2013 (Classic Rock Night 1)
Journey
Whitesnake
Platinum Blonde
Helix

Saturday July 27, 2013 (Classic Rock Night 2)
Styx
Toto
Grand Funk Railroad
Saga
Coney Hatch

Rock the Park 2014 
Rock the Park XI took place July 24–26, 2014. A new event, the Gone Country Music Festival, sponsored by radio station BX93, was held at Harris Park on Wednesday, July 23, 2014.

Wednesday July 23, 2014 – Gone Country Music Festival
Darius Rucker
Dean Brody
Eli Young Band
Tim Hicks

Thursday July 24, 2014
Weezer
Tegan & Sara
Matthew Good
July Talk

Friday July 25, 2014
Sammy Hagar & Friends
Extreme
Tom Keifer of Cinderella
Winger
Survivor

Saturday July 26, 2014
Burton Cummings
Huey Lewis and the News
38 Special
Headpins
FREE FM Under the Covers Winner

Rock the Park 2015 
Rock the Park XII took place July 14–18, 2015.

Tuesday, July 14, 2015
Train
Gin Blossoms
Fastball
The Rembrandts
Matt Nathanson

Wednesday, July 15, 2015 – Gone Country
Keith Urban
Dallas Smith
Jess Moskaluke
Maddie and Tae

Thursday, July 16, 2015 – Gone Country
Lee Brice
Thomas Rhett
Joe Nichols
Chad Brownlee

Friday, July 17, 2015
Arkells
Mother Mother
Tokyo Police Club
Brave Shores
Born Ruffians
Young Empires

Saturday, July 18, 2015
Billy Talent
Rise Against
Killswitch Engage
Gaslight Anthem
Heart Attack Kids

Rock the Park 2016 
Rock the Park 2016 took place July 13–16, 2016

Wednesday, July 13, 2016 – Gone Country
Jake Owen
Dallas Smith
High Valley
Old Dominion

Thursday, July 14, 2016 – Gone Country
Brad Paisley
Tim Hicks
Autumn Hill
River Town Saints

Friday, July 15, 2016
Flo Rida
Nelly
Classified
Ria Mae
Saturday, July 16, 2016
City and Colour
Edward Sharpe and the Magnetic Zeros
Awolnation
The Zolas
Ivory Hours

Rock the Park 2017 
Rock the Park 2017 took place July 12–16, 2017. On April 10, 2017, it was announced that another night, Sunday, July 16, was added to the festival.

Wednesday, July 12, 2017 – BX93’s Gone Country Presents:
 Lady Antebellum
 Kelsea Ballerini
 Brett Young
 Jason Benoit
Thursday, July 13, 2017 – Virgin Radio Presents:
 Wiz Khalifa
 Fetty Wap ft. Monty
 DJ Mustard
 Casper the Ghost
Friday, July 14, 2017 – Virgin Radio Presents: I Love the '90s Tour
 Vanilla Ice
 Salt-N-Pepa
 Naughty by Nature
 Rob Base
 All-4-One
 Color Me Badd
 Young MC
 C+C Music Factory
Saturday, July 15, 2017 – FM96 Presents:
 The Offspring
 Sublime with Rome
 July Talk
 Bleeker
Sunday, July 16, 2017 – Virgin Radio Presents:
 Marianas Trench
 Alessia Cara
 Scott Helman
 Ruth B
 Ryland James

Rock the Park 2018 
Rock the Park 2018 takes place July 11–14, 2018.

Wednesday, July 11, 2018 – FM96 Presents:
 Shinedown
 Chevelle
 Machine Gun Kelly
The Lazys
Bobnoxious

Thursday, July 12, 2018:
 Cyndi Lauper
 Bret Michaels
 Howard Jones
Kim Mitchell
 Richard Page of Mr. Mister
Platinum Blonde
A Flock of Seagulls

Friday, July 13, 2018 – Virgin Radio Presents:
 Boyz II Men
 En Vogue
 Naughty by Nature
 Coolio
Montell Jordan
Sisqó

Saturday, July 14, 2018 –  FM96 Presents:
 Rise Against
 Three Days Grace
 Theory
 Pop Evil
 Texas King

Start.ca Rocks the Park 2019 
Start.ca Rocks the Park 2019 took place July 10–13, 2019.

Wednesday, July 10, 2019 – Pure Country 93 Presents:

Old Dominion
James Barker Band
David Lee Murphy
Russell Dickerson
Tenille Townes
Jade Eagleson

Thursday, July 11, 2019 – FM96 Presents:

 Five Finger Death Punch
 In This Moment
 Killswitch Engage
 I Prevail
 Pop Evil

Friday, July 12, 2019: 97.5 Virgin Radio Presents:

Snoop Dogg
Shaggy
Ma$e
Ginuwine
Tone Loc

Saturday, July 13, 2019: 97.5 Virgin Radio Presents:

On Monday July 8, 2019, due to travel situations, the set order was changed. As a result, the headline act, Pitbull, opened the show, followed by T-Pain and finally Flo Rida.

Pitbull
Flo Rida
T-Pain

Start.ca Rocks the Park 2020 
Start.ca Rocks the Park 2020 was to have taken place July 15–18, 2020.

On April 27, 2020, festival organizers announced that due to the COVID-19 pandemic, the festival had been postponed for one year until 2021. Due to scheduling conflicts, various artists could not be reconfirmed for two of the postponed dates. As a result, the artists who were to perform on Wednesday, July 15, 2020, and Saturday, July 18th, 2020 had been cancelled.

Wednesday, July 15, 2020 – FM96 and 103.1 Fresh FM Present: CANCELLED

Jack Johnson
Vance Joy
TBA
Andy Shauf

Thursday, July 16, 2020 – FM96 Presents: POSTPONED To Thursday July 15, 2021

 Blink-182
 Simple Plan
 grandson

Friday, July 17, 2020: 97.5 Virgin Radio Presents: POSTPONED To Friday July 16, 2021

TLC
Nelly
Arrested Development
Jenny Berggren of Ace of Base
112
2 Live Crew

Saturday, July 18, 2020 Pure Country 93 Presents: CANCELLED

Dallas Smith
Billy Currington
Travis Tritt
Blanco Brown

Start.ca Rocks the Park 2021 
Start.ca Rocks the Park 2021 was to have taken place July 14–17, 2021.

On May 17, 2021, festival organizers announced that due to the COVID-19 pandemic, the festival once again had been postponed for another year until 2022. The organizers said that they were working with the artists to play on the rescheduled dates.

Wednesday, July 14, 2021:

TBA

Thursday, July 15, 2021 – FM96 Presents: POSTPONED To Thursday July 14, 2022

Blink-182
Simple Plan

Friday, July 16, 2021: 97.5 Virgin Radio Presents: POSTPONED To Friday July 15, 2022

On April 27, 2020, Aqua was added to the line up.

TLC
Nelly
Aqua
Jenny Berggren of Ace of Base
2 Live Crew
Arrested Development

Saturday, July 17, 2021:

TBA

Start.ca Rocks the Park 2022 
Start.ca Rocks the Park 2022 took place July 13–17, 2022.

Wednesday, July 13, 2022 – FM96  & fresh103.1 Present:

Alanis Morissette
Garbage
The Beaches
Crash Test Dummies

Thursday, July 14, 2022 – FM96 Presents:

The Glorious Sons
July Talk
Big Wreck
The Trews
Conor Gains

Friday, July 15, 2022 – 97.5 Virgin Radio Presents:

TLC
Aqua
Ja Rule
DMC (of Run-DMC) and the Hellraisers
Jenny Berggren of Ace of Base
112
2 Live Crew

Saturday, July 16, 2022 – FizzFest:
Virginia to Vegas
Kiesza
Alyssa Reid
Rêve (singer)

Sunday, July 17, 2022 – Pure Country 93 Presents:

Dierks Bentley
Ashley McBryde
The Reklaws
Breland

RBC Rock the Park 2023 
RBC Rock the Park 2023 takes place July 12–15, 2023.

Wednesday, July 12, 2023 – FM96 Presents:

 Mumford & Sons
 Vance Joy
 Bahamas
 The Trews

Thursday, July 13, 2023:

 TBA

Friday, July 14, 2023 – 97.5 Virgin Radio Presents:

 Ludacris
 T.I.
 Ja Rule
 Ashanti
 Chingy
 Ying Yang Twins

Saturday, July 15, 2023 – FM96 Presents:

 Billy Talent
 Alexisonfire
 Cypress Hill
 Silverstein
 The Dirty Nil

References

External links 
 
 
 Bethany's Hope Foundation website

Festivals in London, Ontario
Rock festivals in Canada
Music festivals in Ontario
Music festivals established in 2004
2004 establishments in Ontario
Annual events in Ontario